Sard-e Sahra Rural District is in the Central District of Tabriz County, East Azerbaijan province, Iran. At the National Census of 2006, its population was 12,756 in 3,234 households. There were 12,226 inhabitants in 3,550 households at the following census of 2011. At the most recent census of 2016, the population of the rural district was 6,121 in 1,847 households. The largest of its six villages was Asenjan, with 1,745 people.

References 

Tabriz County

Rural Districts of East Azerbaijan Province

Populated places in East Azerbaijan Province

Populated places in Tabriz County